Youssef Mahmoud, a national from Tunisia was appointed by the United Nations Secretary-General Ban Ki-moon as his Special Representative for the United Nations Mission in the Central African Republic and Chad (MINURCAT), effective 1 June 2010. He replaces Victor da Silva Angelo of Portugal, whose function ended in March 2010.

Prior to this appointment, Mahmoud served as United Nations Resident Coordinator and Humanitarian Coordinator and the United Nations Development Programme Resident Representative.

Mahmoud was previously UN Resident Coordinator in Guyana. He also served as UN Transitional Authority in Cambodia(UNTAC) and worked in the Office of Human Resources and Management in New York City.

Mahmoud joined the UN in 1981. Before that, he was Assistant Professor of Linguistics at the University of Tunis, Tunisia and Chairman of the English Department of the Bourguiba Institute of Modern Languages in Tunis.

He was born on 7 August 1947 and is married with two children.

References

External links
 UN Biography, Youssef Mahmoud

Tunisian officials of the United Nations
Living people
1947 births
Academic staff of Tunis University